Gonzalo (also Consalvo, latinized Gundisalvus) is a Spanish masculine given name.

The name is given for Galician Saint Gonzalo (d. c. 1108/12), bishop of Mondoñedo from 1071. It derives from a Gothic name with the first element gunþi- ("battle"). The second element is uncertain, the latinization Gundisalvus may be based on a folk etymological interpretation based on Latin salvus. Suggestions include gunþi-saiwala- (as it were "battle-soul") and gunþis-albs ("battle-elf").

Given name
Notable people with the name include:

Medieval
Saint Gonzalo (Gonzalo Froilaz, d. c. 1112), bishop of Mondoñedo-Ferrol
Gonzalo Ruiz or Rodríguez, feudal lord of La Bureba (or Burueba) throughout much of the mid-twelfth century
Gonzalo Rodríguez Girón (d. 1231), Castillian noble
Gonzalo de Berceo (d. 1264), Castillian poet
Gonzalo Pérez (d. c. 1451), Valencian painter

Early Modern
Gonzalo de Alvarado (born 15th/16th century), brother of Don Pedro
Gonzalo Fernández de Córdoba (1453–1515), known as el Gran Capitán, Castilian general and statesman
Gonzalo Fernández de Córdoba (1585–1635), Spanish military leader
Gonzalo Fernández de Oviedo y Valdés (1478–1557), Castilian writer and historian
Gonzalo Pizarro (1502–1548), Spanish conquistador
Gonzalo Jiménez de Quesada, Spanish explorer and conquistador in northern South America
Gonzalo García Zorro, Spanish conquistador who participated in the Spanish conquest of the Muisca people
Gonzalo Guerrero, Spanish sailor who was enslaved by the Maya and later became a respected warrior under a Maya Lord 
Gonzalo Macías, Spanish conquistador who participated in the expedition from Santa Marta into the Muisca Confederation
Gonzalo Méndez de Canço (1554–1622), Spanish Admiral and the seventh Governor of Florida (1596–1603)
Gonzalo Suárez Rendón, Spanish conquistador, known as the founder of Boyacá and Tunja

Modern
Gonzalo, Duke of Aquitaine (1937–2000)
Gonzalo Abán (born 1987), Argentine footballer
Gonzalo Aguirre Beltrán (1908–1996), Mexican anthropologist
Gonzalo Arango (1931–1975), Colombian poet/novelist and founder of Nadaism
Gonzalo Arconada, Spanish football manager
Gonzalo Barroilhet (born 1986), Chilean decathlete
Gonzalo Castro Randón, German footballer of Spanish origin
Gonzalo "Chory" Castro Irizábal, Uruguayan footballer
Gonzalo Colsa (born 1977), Spanish footballer
Gonzalo Córdova (1863–1928), Ecuadorian president
Gonzalo Curiel (composer) (1904–1958), Mexican film composer
Gonzalo P. Curiel (born 1953), United States District Judge
Gonzalo de la Fuente (born 1984), Spanish footballer
Gonzalo de la Torre (born 1977), Mexican-American singer-songwriter, director and producer
Gonzalo Escobar, Ecuadorian tennis player
Gonzalo Fernández (Uruguayan politician), Foreign Minister of Uruguay since 2008
Gonzalo Fernández-Castaño (born 1980), Spanish golfer
Gonzalo Garcia (basketball) (born 1967), Argentine basketball coach
Gonzalo Garcia (dancer) (born 1979/1980), New York City Ballet principal dancer
Gonzalo García García (born 1983), Spanish footballer
Gonzalo García Núñez (born 1947), Peruvian economist/politician
Gonzalo Higuaín (born 1987), Argentine-French footballer
Gonzalo Javier Rodríguez (born 1984), Argentine footballer
Gonzalo Jara, Chilean footballer
Gonzalo Lira (born 1968), Chilean-American novelist
Gonzalo Longo (born 1974), Argentine rugby union player
Gonzalo Márquez (1946–1984), Venezuelan-American baseball player
Gonzalo Miranda (born 1979), Chilean track and road cyclist
Gonzalo Fernández de la Mora, Spanish essayist and politician
Gonzalo Piermarteri (born 1995), Argentine footballer
Gonzalo Pineda Reyes, Mexican footballer
Gonzalo Ramos (actor) (born 1989), Spanish actor
Gonzalo Ramos (footballer) (born 1991), Uruguayan footballer
Gonzalo Rodríguez (disambiguation), several people
Gonzalo Rodríguez Gacha (1947–1989), co-founder of the Medellín drug cartel and founder of paramilitarism in Colombia
Gonzalo Rodriguez-Pereyra (born 1969), British philosopher
Gonzalo Rodríguez Risco, Peruvian playwright and screenwriter
Gonzalo X. Ruiz, Argentine baroque oboist
Gonzalo Salas (born 1974), Argentine road cyclist
Gonzalo Sánchez de Lozada, Bolivian politician and businessman
Gonzalo Sorondo (born 1979), Uruguayan footballer
Gonzalo Suárez (born 1934), Spanish writer/director
Gonzalo Torrente Ballester, Spanish writer associated with the Generation of '36 movement
Gonzalo Vargas (born 1981), Uruguayan footballer

Pseudonym
Gonzalo, nom de guerre of Shining Path leader Abimael Guzmán

Fictional characters
Gonzalo (Shakespeare), a courtier in Shakespeare's The Tempest

Surname
Julie Gonzalo, Argentine-American actress and producer

See also 

Gonçalo, its Portuguese equivalent
González (surname) and Gonzales (surname), Spanish surnames meaning 'son of Gonzalo'
Lalo (nickname)

Spanish masculine given names